X15p is a class of narrow gauge electric multiple units to be operated by SL on the Roslag Railway. 22 3-car sets will be delivered from 2020 to increase capacity on the network; the first of which were delivered in autumn 2020. Testing of the trains has been going on since then but no date is set for when they can enter regular service. The name follows Swedish tradition for rail vehicle names, in which X means electric multiple unit, and the last p means 891 mm gauge.

References

External links 
SL köper in nya tåg till Roslagsbanan  

Stadler Rail multiple units
X15p
Stockholm
1500 V DC multiple units